Frederick, Fred or Freddie Fisher may refer to:
 Frederick Fisher (soldier) (1894–1915), Canadian First World War soldier awarded the Victoria Cross
 Frederick Thomas Fisher (1872–1906), American Medal of Honor recipient
 Frederick Bohn Fisher (1882–1938), American religious leader
 Frederick Fisher (architect), American architect in Southern California
 Frederick Victor Fisher (1870–1954), British political activist
 Fred Fisher (1875–1942), American songwriter
 Fred R. Fisher (1871–1959), American politician
 Fred Fisher (lawyer) (1921–1989), American lawyer
 Eric Fisher (cricketer) (Frederick Eric Fisher, 1924–1996), New Zealand cricketer
 Freddie Fisher (Big Brother), housemate in the 10th UK series
 Freddie Fisher (musician) (1904–1967), American musician
 Fred Fisher (footballer, born January 1910) (1910–1955), English footballer (Swindon Town)
 Fred Fisher (footballer, born April 1910) (1910–1944), English footballer
 Fred Fisher (footballer, born 1920) (1920–1993), English footballer (Grimsby Town)
 William Frederick Fisher (born 1946), American astronaut
 Fisher's ghost, an Australian legend
 Assistant Chief Constable Freddie Fisher, a character in Pie in the Sky